the everybodyfields was an indie folk/alt-country band from Johnson City, Tennessee. The band was co-founded and fronted by Sam Quinn and Jill Andrews who met in 1999 while working at a summer camp. They were joined by dobroist David Richey. After Richey's departure, electric guitarist Megan McCormick joined the band; followed by fiddler Megan Gregory and drummer Travis Kammeyer. They were succeeded by keyboardist Josh Oliver, pedal steel player Tom Pryor, and drummer Jamie Cook.

the everybodyfields combined country, folk, bluegrass, rock and roll, and Americana to produce a unique sound that Harp Magazine called "stompin’ and twangin’ in world-class style." Sam Quinn's song "T.V.A." from Halfway There: Electricity and the South won 1st place in the Chris Austin Songwriting Contest 2005 at Merlefest. "Lonely Anywhere," from the album Nothing is Okay, was chosen by NPR as Song Of The Day for 29 February 2008. The band was the focus of increasing attention as a representative of the alternative country genre.  They were chosen to play at Bonnaroo, Bristol Rhythm & Roots Reunion and Twangfest in 2008.

On June 5, 2009, the everybodyfields posted an announcement on their website that they were disbanding in order for Sam Quinn and Jill Andrews to pursue their respective solo careers.

In September 2011, reunion shows were held at the Bristol Rhythm & Roots festival and at Music City Roots.

Members
 Jill Andrews (vocals, bass guitar, acoustic guitar)
 Sam Quinn (vocals, acoustic guitar, bass guitar)
 Josh Oliver (keyboard, guitar)
 Tom Pryor (pedal steel)
 Jamie Cook (drums)

Former
 David Richey (vocals, dobro)
 Megan McCormick (vocals, lap steel, electric guitar)
 Megan Gregory (vocals, fiddle)
 Andrew Kelly (vocals, electric guitar, mandolin)
 Travis Kammeyer (drums)
 Angela Oudean (vocals, fiddle)
 Emma O'Donnell (fiddle)

Discography
 Halfway There: Electricity and the South (2004)
 Plague of Dreams (2005)
 Nothing is Okay (2007)

References

Further reading

External links
Official site (archived July 6, 2009)
the everybodyfields at Myspace
the everybodyfields Ramseur Records page (archived May 1, 2009)
the everybodyfields at Daytrotter (archived August 28, 2008)

 the everybodyfields at EKS Sound (archived August 3, 2004)

American alternative country groups
Americana music groups
American indie folk groups
Country music groups from Tennessee